A list of Ministers of Internal Affairs of historical states located on the territory of what is now Ukraine.

Ukrainian People's Republic
The Ministers of Foreign Affairs of the Ukrainian People's Republic:
Volodymyr Vynnychenko June 28, 1917 – January 30, 1918 (at first as a secretary of the Russian Provisional Government later as an independent Ministry)
Pavlo Khrystiuk January 30, 1918 – February 1918
Mykhailo Tkachenko February 1918–April 29, 1918
Vyshnevsky April 30, 1918–May 4, 1918
Fedir Lyzohub May 4, 1918–November 14, 1918
Ihor Kistiakivsky November 14, 1918–December 14, 1918
O.Mytsiuk December 26, 1918–February 13, 1919
Dmytro Chyzhevsky February 13, 1919–April 9, 1919
Isaak Mazepa April 9, 1919–May 26, 1920
O.Salikovsky May 26, 1920–in exile

Soviet period
Yevgenia Bosch December 30, 1917 – March 1, 1918 (acting Prime-Minister)
Yuriy Kotsiubynsky March 7, 1918 – April 18, 1918 (government disbanded)
Vasiliy Averin November 28, 1918–January 29, 1919 (as the Temporary Workers'-Peasants' Government)
Kliment Voroshilov (as part of the Russian Narkom)
Christian Rakovsky
Kin Antonov
Mykola Skrypnyk 1921–1922
Mantsev 1922–1923
Nykolayenko 1923
(acting) Buzdalin 1923–1924
Vsevolod Balytsky March 1924–December 1930 (ministry disbanded)
Vsevolod Balytsky 1934–1937
(acting) Vasiliy Ivanov 1937
Izrail Leplevsky 1937–1938
Oleksandr Uspensky 1938
(acting) Amayak Kobulov 1938–1939
Ivan Serov 1939–1941
Vasyl Serhiyenko 1941–1943
1946–1953 Tymofiy Strokach 
1953–1953 Pavlo Meshik 
1953–1956 Tymofiy Strokach 
1953–1956 Oleksiy Brovkin 
1962–1982 Ivan Holovchenko 
1982–1990 Ivan Hladush 
1990–1991 Andriy Vasylyshyn

Independent Ukraine

References

Interior ministers